Sphagneticola is a genus of flowering plants in the family Asteraceae. Creeping-oxeye is a common name for plants in this genus.

 Species
 Sphagneticola brachycarpa (Baker) Pruski - Guyana, Venezuela, Brazil, Paraguay, Argentina, Peru, Bolivia
 Sphagneticola calendulacea  (L.) Pruski - China, Japan, India, Sri Lanka, Indochina, Indonesia, Philippines
 Sphagneticola gracilis  (Rich.) Pruski - Puerto Rico, Cuba, Hispaniola, Jamaica, Antigua
 Sphagneticola trilobata (L.) Pruski - native to South America, widely naturalized in many subtropical and tropical regions (Asia, Australia, Pacific Islands, Mesoamerica, West Indies, Florida, Louisiana etc.)
 Sphagneticola ulei O.Hoffm. - native to the American tropics

References

External links

Heliantheae
Asteraceae genera